Shyril O'Steen (born October 5, 1960, in Seattle, Washington) is an American former competitive rower and Olympic gold medalist.  She was a member of the American women's eights team that won the gold medal at the 1984 Summer Olympics in Los Angeles, California.

References

 

1960 births
Living people
Rowers from Seattle
American female rowers
Rowers at the 1984 Summer Olympics
Olympic gold medalists for the United States in rowing
Medalists at the 1984 Summer Olympics
World Rowing Championships medalists for the United States
21st-century American women